Gornje Vratno  is a village in Croatia. It is connected by the D2 highway.

Populated places in Varaždin County